The Hong Kong cricket team and Papua New Guinea cricket team toured Australia from 8 to 13 November 2014, playing two One Day Internationals (ODI) and a three-day match. These were the first ODI matches to be played by Papua New Guinea since gaining ODI status by the International Cricket Council. Papua New Guinea won the ODI series 2–0, becoming the first country to win their first two ODI matches. The matches were played at the Tony Ireland Stadium in Townsville, which had recently been accredited as an international venue by the ICC.

Squads

ODI series

1st ODI

2nd ODI

Three-day match

References

External links
 Series home at ESPN Cricinfo

International cricket competitions in 2014–15